The term Marquette Building may refer to:

Marquette Building (Chicago), completed in 1895
Marquette Building (Detroit), built in 1905
Marquette Building (St. Louis), completed in 1914